Rocca Priora is a small town and comune in the Metropolitan City of Rome, Lazio,  Italy.

History
Rocca Priora occupied the area of the old Latin town of Corbium; here several battles, described by ancient historians, were fought by Italic peoples.

After the destruction of Tusculum in 1191, the population increased. In the 14th century the  Savelli family rose to prominence in the area, after  Pope Sixtus V endorsed Rocca Priora as a feudal possession for them. They held the town and its castle until the 17th century, apart from two short periods in 1436–47 and in the early 16th century, when it went to Cesare Borgia. According to some sources, the town was destroyed by Renzo da Ceri's troops during the conflict between Pope Clement VII and the Colonna, and by the imperial troops in the wake of the Sack of Rome (1527). 

After a period as a direct Papal rule, it was sold in part to the Rospigliosi family, who held it until 1870, when it became a commune as part of the newly formed Kingdom of Italy.

Twin cities 
 Sohland an der Spree, Germany

People
Gregorius Maltzeff, painter (1881–1953)
Marco Amelia, football player (1982)

References

 

Cities and towns in Lazio
Castelli Romani